is a Japanese speed skater. He competed at the 2002 Winter Olympics and the 2006 Winter Olympics.

References

1983 births
Living people
Japanese male speed skaters
Olympic speed skaters of Japan
Speed skaters at the 2002 Winter Olympics
Speed skaters at the 2006 Winter Olympics
Sportspeople from Nagano Prefecture
Speed skaters at the 2003 Asian Winter Games
Speed skaters at the 2007 Asian Winter Games
Medalists at the 2003 Asian Winter Games
Medalists at the 2007 Asian Winter Games
Asian Games medalists in speed skating
Asian Games bronze medalists for Japan